Władysław Leopold Jaworski (1865 – 1930) was a Polish jurist and politician.

He studied law in Cracow, Berlin and Paris, and assumed a professorship of civil law in Cracow in 1897. An adherent of the conservative party, he was elected to the Diet of Galicia in 1901 and to the Council of State in Vienna in 1911. When World War I broke out, he headed the Supreme National Committee, a Polish government in Galicia.

In 1918, Jaworski resigned from politics to focus on his legal scholarship. His broad writings include several monographs on the civil and administrative law of Austria-Hungary and Poland.

References

 

1865 births
1930 deaths
People from Busko County
People from the Kingdom of Galicia and Lodomeria
Polish politicians
Members of the Austrian House of Deputies (1911–1918)
Members of the Diet of Galicia and Lodomeria
Polish jurists

Polish conservatives